This is an overview of the postage stamps and postal history of the Free City of Danzig .

Danzig, now Gdańsk, is a Polish city on the Baltic coast. It was the Free City of Danzig with its own stamps from 1920 until 1939.

First stamps
The first stamps of Danzig were overprinted German stamps issued on 14 June 1920. The first stamps of the Danzig Free State appeared in January 1921 and continued in use until the outbreak of World War II in 1939. At that time the Free City was annexed by Nazi Germany.

Polish post office

A Polish Post Office operated in the harbour of Danzig (see Polish Post Office in Danzig). This used Polish stamps overprinted PORT GDANSK.

See also
Postage stamps and postal history of Germany
Postage stamps and postal history of Poland

References

Further reading
Erler, Martin. Catalogue of the Adhesive Revenue Stamps of Germany, Vol. V, Danzig, Memel, Oberschlesien. Icking, Germany: ORA-Verlag, 1995. .
 Jank, Janusz. Działalność usługowa poczty polskiej w wolnym mieście Gdańsku w latach 1920-1939 = The Polish postal service in the Free City of Danzig between 1920-1939. Gdansk: Dyrekcja Okręgu Poczty, 1999  143p.
 Klien, U. E. Alte Marken in neuem Licht: Ein Beitrag zur Danzig-Philatelie. Siegen: The Author, 1987 25p.
 Rittmeister, Werner. Danzig, Sonder- und Werbestempel, 1904-1945. Hamburg: The Author, 1987 48p.
 Weise, Karl Christian. Danzig, Geschichte und Philatelie. Straubenhardt: The Author, 48p.
 Wolff, Klaus. Danzig Stempelkatalog. Berlin: K. Wolff, 1993-2005

External links
at Danzig Gdańsk.

Free City of Danzig
Danzig
Danzig